This is a list of bands from Canada. Only bands appear here; individual musicians are listed at list of Canadian musicians.

0-9

A

B

C

D

E

F

G

H

I

J

K

L

M

N

O

P

Q

R

S

T

U

V

W

X

Y

Z

See also

List of bands from British Columbia
:Category:Canadian musical groups
:Category:Canadian record labels
:Category:Music festivals in Canada
List of Canadian musicians

References

Bands
Lists of Canadian musicians